The Taiwan Excellence Awards are yearly awards that are given out by the Ministry of Economic Affairs (MOEA) and Taiwan External Trade Development Council (TAITRA) to encourage Taiwan industries to upgrade and incorporate innovation and value into their products. The selection of awards is based on four criteria: R&D, design, quality, and marketing. Each product must score evenly well in each category in order to be selected. An international panel of judges is invited to participate in this selection, in which the finalists surface after several evaluations.

Several plans were launched to promote the product designs, qualities and images of Taiwan: Quality Enhancement Plan (1988), Product Design Ability Enhancement Plan (1989), and the 1990 Image Enhancement Plan (IEP). This eventually led to the Branding Taiwan Project  developed in 2006 with strong focus on the IEP. The IEP steadily enhanced the image of Made in Taiwan products in three different stages with a specific objective during each stage:
 First stage (1990–1995): Focus on improving the negative image of Made In Taiwan products.
 Second stage (1995–2000): An important criterion, innovalue ("innovation" plus "added value"), was created.
 Third stage (current stage): Image reformation of Made In Taiwan products through an integrated global information campaign.

The objective is to transform Taiwan from a regional manufacturing center into a global R&D and innovation center.

Type of Awards 
Taiwan Excellence Awards. After careful evaluation, the judges select the products which are authorized to display the symbol of Taiwan Excellence attached with the winning year. 
Silver Awards. A panel of judges elects up to 30 finalists from the Taiwan Excellence Award winners for screening. After the gold winners are selected, the remaining are awarded with the Silver Awards. 
Gold Awards. A maximum of eight products may be awarded with the Gold Award. 
Taiwan Excellence for Best Performance. An award that is delivered to the corporation who won the most Taiwan Excellence Awards for the year. 
Taiwan Excellence Achievement Awards. Presented to the companies who have earned at least 50 Taiwan Excellence Awards during the past years. 
Popularity Award. The public participates in the nomination of the 30 finalists and the most popular product is awarded.

2008 Taiwan Excellence Award Winners
Gold Awards (8) 
Silver Awards (21) 
Certificates for Taiwan Excellence (112) 
Taiwan Excellence for Best Performance (1) 
Taiwan Excellence Achievement Award (2) 
Popularity Award (1)

2009 Taiwan Excellence Award Winners
Gold Award Winners List (8): 
Eee PC S101 -ASUSTeK Computer Inc. 
City Speed -Giant Manufacturing Co., Ltd. 
Touch Diamond -High Tech Computer Corp. 
Energy Conservation Driving Module -Hiwin Technologies Corp. 
Pico Pocket Projector -Optoma Corp. 
WorldCard -Penpower Technology Ltd. 
Ratcheting Adjustable Wrench -Proxene Tools Co., Ltd. 
Rice Cooker -Tatung Co.

Silver Award Winners List (22): 
PocketCinema -AIPTEK International Inc. 
3.5G Super Performance PDA Phone -ASUSTeK Computer Inc. 
Bamboo Series Notebook Bamboo -ASUSTeK Computer Inc. 
Short-Throw Gaming Projector -BenQ Corp. 
19-inch Wide Panel -Chi Mei Optoelectronics Corp. 
Taiwan Blue Magpie Collection -Franz Collection Inc. 
TCR Advanced SL TCR Advanced -Giant Manufacturing Co., Ltd. 
Linear Motor Air Bearing Platform -Hiwin Mikrosystem Corp. 
Treadmill - Johnson Health Tech. Co., Ltd. 
Functional Trainer - Johnson Health Tech. Co., Ltd. 
Vertical Machining Center -Kao Fong Machinery Co., Ltd. 
Jockey G5 125/150 -Kwang Yang Industry Co., Ltd. 
Solargizer leading desktop combo -KYE Systems Corp.(Genius) 
Full suspension MTB – One Five O -Mérida Industry Co., Ltd. 
Elixir DDR3 SODIMM series -Nanya Technology Corporation 
Pacific IF -Pacific Cycles, Inc. 
Refrigerator -Panasonic Taiwan Co., Ltd. 
All Terrain Vehicle (ATV) -Taiwan Golden Bee Co., Ltd. 
Fine Arts Counter Top Gas Hobs -Taiwan Sakura Corporation 
Fine Arts Chimney Range Hood -Taiwan Sakura Corp. 
Dual-Band Wireless-N Router -ZyXEL Communications Corp. 
WiMAX Indoor Femto Base Station -ZyXEL Communications Corp.

See also
 Made in Taiwan

References

Photos of 2008 Taiwan Excellence Awards ceremony 
About TAITRA Taiwan External Trade Development Council
2009 Taiwan Excellence Awards

Taiwan Excellence in the ICT industry
 
Media Releases
 
Taiwan Excellence Awards 2011
 

Taiwanese awards
Society of Taiwan